This is a list of people who served as Lord Lieutenant of Haverfordwest. The county corporate of Haverfordwest was usually under the jurisdiction of the Lord Lieutenant of Pembrokeshire, but it had its own Lord Lieutenant and Custos Rotulorum from 1761 until 1931.

Lord Lieutenants of Haverfordwest to 1931
Sir John Philipps, Bt 14 May 1761 – 23 June 1764
vacant
Sir Richard Philipps, Bt (Baron Milford from 1776) 28 April 1770 – 28 November 1823
Richard Philipps (Sir Richard Philipps, Bt, from 1828 and Baron Milford from 1847) 19 February 1824 – 3 January 1857
Sir John Philipps-Scourfield, Bt 1 July 1857 – 3 June 1876
Sir Charles Philipps, Bt 7 August 1876 – 27 October 1924
The Lord Kylsant 27 October 1924 – 7 November 1931

Notes

References

Pembrokeshire
Haverfordwest